Oxitriptyline (BS-7679) is an anticonvulsant of the tricyclic family which was never marketed.

See also 

 Carbamazepine
 Eslicarbazepine
 Oxcarbazepine
 Benzocycloheptenes

References 

Acetamides
Anticonvulsants
Dibenzocycloheptenes
Abandoned drugs